The Soviet Union national junior handball team was the national under–20 Handball team of the Soviet Union. It was controlled by the Soviet Union Handball Federation, it represented the Soviet Union in international matches.

Statistics

IHF Junior World Championship record
 Champions   Runners up   Third place   Fourth place

External links
 World Men's Junior Championship table
 European Men's Junior Championship table

References 

 

Men's national junior handball teams